Adityapur Industrial Area  also known as Adityapur Industrial Area City short form AIA or AIA City is an industrial hub and an Industrial, technological, engineering district located at Adityapur, Jamshedpur, Jharkhand, India.  Adityapur Industrial Area is actually an industrial belt, which lies in Adityapur. It is a Special Economic Zone.

Location 
Located at Adityapur, which is city and a part of the city Jamshedpur.

Infrastucture and Industry 
It is one of the biggest industrial belts not only in Eastern region but the entire India. Prior to Noida it was the biggest industrial belt of the country. The region mainly houses a large number of Small and Medium scale in industry with some Large scale industries as well. The Adityapur Industrial Area Development Authority is the governing body of the region and looks after the development of the industrial region. The region has as over 1000 industrial units as of 2010. The region gives direct employment to around 28000 people. The average annual production of the belt is in excess of Rs. 36 billion at present.

Education 
NIT Jamshedpur 
Rantech ITI College

See also 
 Economy of Jamshedpur
 Economy of Bokaro
 Marafari
 Electronic City
 HITEC City

References 

Industrial parks in India
Economy of Jharkhand
Neighbourhoods in Jamshedpur